BotFighters is a location-based mobile game and a pervasive game, developed by It's Alive Mobile Games AB! (acquired by Digiment in 2007) designed to be a MMORPG played in an urban environment. It was possibly the world's first commercial location-based game. It was first released in Sweden on 14 March 2001, and later in Russia, Finland, Ireland and China.
In 2002, it was awarded with an Award of Distinction, Net Vision category in the Prix Ars Electronica.

The mission of the game was to locate and destroy other players. Each player was represented in the game as a robot warrior.  Successful battles were rewarded with money which could be traded in, via a website, for armor upgrades and other features for the player's robot. The game was temporally expansive, because there were no safe zones or timeouts; players were always playing. The likeness of the game has been compared to that of Paintball.

Gameplay
BotFighters is an location-based mobile game and a pervasive game, that makes use of the positioning technology of a mobile phone to playing the game.

See also
 Location-based mobile game
 Alternate reality game
 Location-based service
 Sentient computing
 Ubiquitous computing

References

External links
 BotFighters on GameSpot
 Have Cell Phone, Will Shoot – article on BotFighters and other location-based games from Wired
 Ready, aim, text – article on BotFighters from The Guardian

Mobile games
Urban games
2001 video games
Java platform games
Location-based games
Video games developed in Sweden
J2ME games
Geolocation-based video games